Vittalur is a village in the Kumbakonam taluk of Thanjavur district, Tamil Nadu.

Demographics 

As per the 2001 census, Vittalur had a total population of 1688 with 853 males and 835 females. The sex ratio was 979. The literacy rate was 69.75.

References 

 

Villages in Thanjavur district